Aniconism in Judaism covers a number of areas. The portrayal of God in any kind of human or concrete form is strictly prohibited.

Hebrew Bible  
A number of verses in the Hebrew Bible (Tanakh) refer to prohibitions against the creation of various forms of images, invariably linked directly with idolatry. The strongest source is based on what Judaism counts as the second of the Ten Commandments:

Leviticus 26:1 reads:

Similar injunctions appear in Numbers 33:52, Deuteronomy 4:16, and 27:15; in all cases, the creation of the image is associated with idolatry, and indeed, the words commonly translated as 'image' or some variant thereof are generally used interchangeably with words typically translated as 'idol' (e.g.  ).

Based on these prohibitions, the Hebrew prophets, such as Isaiah, Jeremiah, Amos, and others, preached very strongly against idolatry. In many of their sermons, as recorded in the biblical books bearing their names, the prophets regarded the use of religious images as a negative sign of assimilation into the surrounding pagan cultures of the time. Lenient Torah commentators permit drawing of humans as long as the images are not used for idolatry.

Halakha 

Despite the semantic association with idols, halakha (Jewish law) as taught by the Shulkhan Aruch interprets the verses as prohibiting the creation of certain types of graven images of people, angels, or astronomical bodies, whether or not they are actually used as idols. The Shulkhan Aruch states: "It is forbidden to make complete solid or raised images of people or angels, or any images of heavenly bodies except for purposes of study". ("Heavenly bodies" are included here because the stars and planets were worshipped by some religions in human forms. Astronomical models for scientific purposes are permitted under the category of "study.")

The prohibition is therefore seen as applying specifically to certain forms of sculpture and depictions of the human face. In keeping with this prohibition, some illustrations from the Middle Ages feature fantastic creatures—usually animal-headed humanoids, even when the depictions are quite clearly meant to be those of historical or mythological humans. The most well-known is the Birds' Head Haggadah (Germany, circa 1300). Because such creatures as gryphons, harpies, sphinxes, and the phoenix do not actually exist, no violation of the prohibition is perceived in such depictions. This is based on the fact that the commandment, as stated in Exodus, refers specifically to "anything in the heaven above, on the earth below, or in the water below the land." However, it is forbidden to make the four faces on the Divine Chariot of the Book of Ezekiel or the ministering angels, because these are believed to be real beings that actually exist "in the heaven above." (Kitzur Shulchan Aruch 168:1)

Differences across media 

Although the prohibition applies mainly to sculpture, there are some authorities who prohibit two-dimensional full-face depictions. Some base this upon their understanding of the Talmud, and others based it upon Kabbalah. Of note is the portrait of Rabbi Tzvi Ashkenazi (known as "the Hakham Tzvi"), which is housed in the Jewish Museum in London. Based on his interpretation of this prohibition, Tzvi refused to sit for his portrait. However, the London Jewish Community wanted a portrait, so they commissioned the portrait to be done without the Tzvi's knowledge. Tzvi's son, Rabbi Jacob Emden, says it was a perfect likeness.

There is one type of representation, bas-relief or raised representation on a flat surface, that is particularly problematic. Rabbi Jacob Emden discusses a medal struck in honor of Rabbi Eliezer Horowitz that features Horowitz's portrait. Emden ruled this violated the injunction against depictions. Many hold that such representations in the synagogue either violate this injunction or are not permitted, as they give the appearance of violating this injunction. Most notably, Rabbi David ibn Zimra and Rabbi Joseph Karo hold that carvings of lions (representing the Lion of Judah) are inappropriate in synagogues.

Some authorities hold that Judaism has no objection to photography or other forms of two-dimensional art, and depictions of humans can be seen in religious books such as the Passover Haggadah, as well as children's books about biblical and historical personages. Although most Hasidic Jews object to having televisions in their homes, this is not related to prohibitions against idolatry, but, rather, to the content of network and cable programming. Hasidim of all groups regularly display portraits of their Rebbes, and, in some communities, the children trade "rabbi cards" that are similar to baseball cards. In both Hasidic and Orthodox Judaism, taking photographs or filming are forbidden on the Shabbat and Jewish holy days, but this prohibition has nothing to do with idolatry. Rather, it is related to the prohibition against working or creating on these days.

In historical periods 

Many art historians have long believed that there was a tradition in antiquity, with no surviving examples, of luxury illuminated manuscript scrolls of books from the Tanakh among Hellenized Jews. The evidence for this is Christian works of the Late Antique and Early Medieval periods whose iconography is thought to derive from works in this tradition. Examples of the later works include the Joshua Roll and, more controversially, the Utrecht Psalter.

The 3rd century CE Dura-Europos synagogue in Syria has large areas of wall paintings with figures of the prophets and others, and narrative scenes. There are several representations of the Hand of God, suggesting that this motif reached Christian art from Judaism. A virtually unique Christian mosaic depiction of the Ark of the Covenant (806) at Germigny-des-Prés, which includes the hand, is believed also to be derived from Jewish iconography; the Ark also appears at Dura-Europos. Several ancient synagogues in the land of Israel have also been excavated, revealing large floor-mosaics with figurative elements, especially animals and representations of the Zodiac.

Some of these, notably at Naaran in the West Bank, have had the living figures removed, leaving inanimate symbols such as the Temple menorah intact. It has been proposed that this was done by the Jewish community in the 6th or early 7th century, as part of a controversy within Judaism over images that paralleled that within Christianity leading to the Byzantine iconoclasm, leading to a stricter attitude towards images, at least in synagogues. There is also evidence that from about 570 new synagogue mosaics were aniconic. An alternative explanation for the removals is that they were done after the Muslim conquest, and related to the decree of Caliph Yazid II in 721 (although this referred to Christian images). The decoration of cave walls and sarcophagi at the Beit She'arim necropolis also uses images, some drawn from Hellenistic pagan mythology, in the 2nd to 4th centuries CE.

There are many later Jewish illuminated manuscripts from the Middle Ages, and some other works with human figures. The "Birds Head Haggadah" (German, now in Jerusalem) gives all the human figures the heads of birds, presumably in an attempt to mitigate any breach of the prohibition.

In modern Israel 

In the state of Israel, all religious sites, Jewish and non-Jewish alike, are protected by law. Even though Jewish law teaches that idolatry is forbidden to all of humanity as one of the Seven Laws of Noah, Jews today combat it through discussion, debate, and education, rather than the physical destruction of statues and shrines. However, most traditional Jews still follow the prohibitions against entering places of idolatry, and will not attend functions held in buildings where there are religious statues.

Recent scholarship 
In a refutation of the belief in an aniconic Judaism, and more generally in an underestimation of Jewish visual arts, the historian of ideas Kalman Bland recently proposed that the phenomenon is a modern construction, and that "Jewish aniconism crystallized simultaneously with the construction of modern Jewish identities". Others have also argued that the notion of a total prohibition of figural representation in the Biblical and Hellenistic-Roman periods is untenable.

Until the 20th century, Judaism was believed always to have been aniconic. The view was probably first challenged by Dávid Kaufmann, who marshalled a large and comprehensive corpus of data in order to prove it untenable. He was the first to use the term "Jewish art" in an article published in 1878, and is regarded as the founder of the scholarly discipline of Jewish art history. His disciple Dr. Samuel Krauss wrote in 1901:

See also 
 Aniconism in Islam
 Iconoclasm

Notes

References
 Barber, Charles, The Truth in Painting: Iconoclasm and Identity in Early-Medieval Art, Speculum, Vol. 72, No. 4 (Oct., 1997), pp. 1019-1036, JSTOR
 
 
 

Judaism
Jewish theology